Marble Canyon may refer to:

In Canada 
 Marble Canyon (British Columbia), in the south-central interior of British Columbia.
 Marble Canyon (Canadian Rockies), west of Banff in Kootenay National Park in British Columbia.

In the United States

Arizona 
 Marble Canyon, a  canyon of the Colorado River from Lees Ferry in Glen Canyon to the confluence of the Little Colorado River in the Grand Canyon; in Grand Canyon National Park and Kaibab National Forest; Coconino County, north-central Arizona; U.S. Geological Survey Geographic Names Information System: Marble Canyon.
 Marble Canyon, Arizona, an unincorporated community along Arizona State Route 89A at the Navajo Bridge crossing of the Colorado River; in Coconino County, north-central Arizona; U.S. Geological Survey Geographic Names Information System: Marble Canyon.
 Marble Canyon National Monument, a former national monument established in 1969 to protect Marble Canyon; now part of Grand Canyon National Park.
 Marble Canyon, a valley between the Bowie and Wood Mountains in Coronado National Forest; in Cochise County, southeast Arizona; U.S. Geological Survey Geographic Names Information System: Marble Canyon.

California 
 Marble Canyon, a  valley in the Panamint Range through the Cottonwood Mountains into Mesquite Flat in Death Valley; in Death Valley National Park; in Inyo County, east-central California; U.S. Geological Survey Geographic Names Information System: Marble Canyon.
 Marble Canyon, a  valley in the Inyo Mountains to Eureka Valley; in Inyo National Forest and Death Valley National Park; in Inyo County, east-central California; U.S. Geological Survey Geographic Names Information System: Marble Canyon.
 Marble Canyon, a  valley near Black Mountain towards Westgard Pass; in Inyo National Forest; in Inyo County, east-central California; U.S. Geological Survey Geographic Names Information System: Marble Canyon.